Sajjan Singh Cheema is a former basketball player from India. He represented India in 1982 Asian Games and other international tournaments and matches including Asian Basketball Championship in 1981, 1983 and 1985. He was honoured with Arjuna award in 1999 and Maharaja Ranjit Singh Award in 1983.

Early life
Sajjan Singh was born in 1957 in Dabulian village in Kapurthala district in Punjab state. He studied at Kamalia Khalsa High School Kapurthala and at Sport College Jalandhar.

Career
He started playing basketball in 1976 and first participated in Inter university tournament held in Jaipur in 1976. His first played national from Andhra Pradesh and later went on to represent Punjab for more than a decade. He played for India in the FIBA Asia Basketball Championship teams in 1981, 1983, and 1985, and represented the country in the Asian Games in 1982.He retired from playing in 1994. He served as SP with Punjab Police and additionally the Deputy Commissioner of Police (Traffic) Ludhiana.

Political career 
He joined the Aam Aadmi Party (AAP) in April 2016. The main motive to join AAP was to improve India’s Education and Sports and also to make India a drug free country .

Personal life
His brothers Balkar Singh and Gurmeet Singh and cousin Kuldeep Singh Cheema also played basketball and represented India. Guneet Kaur the daughter of Sajjan Singh has played in the under-17 category at the national level. His nephew Amritpal singh cheema is international kabbadi player famous with title name know as Shurli khiranwalia 

Being appointed as the Candidate for Aam Aadmi Party from Sultanpur Lodhi Constituency for the Punjab elections of 2017.

References

External links
 Arjuna Award
 Profile at punjabbasketball.org (archived)

Indian men's basketball players
Recipients of the Arjuna Award
Basketball players from Punjab, India
Asian Games competitors for India
Indian police officers
People from Kapurthala
1957 births
Living people
Indian Sikhs
Aam Aadmi Party politicians from Delhi
Shiromani Akali Dal politicians